Shaquille O'Neal (born 1972) is an American sports analyst, rapper, and former professional basketball player.

Shaq may also refer to:
 A given name or nickname derived from Shaquille, which in turn is derived from the Arabic name Shakil.

People
Shaq Barrett (born 1992), American football linebacker
Shaq Buchanan (born 1997), American basketball player
Shaq Calhoun (born 1996), American football player
Shaq Coulthirst (born 1994), English footballer
Shaq Evans (born 1991), American football wide receiver
Shaq Forde (born 2004), English footballer
Shaq Griffin (born 1995), American football cornerback player
Shaq Johnson (born 1993), Canadian football wide receiver player
Shaq Lawson (born 1994), American football defensive end player
Shaq Mason (born 1993), American football offensive guard player
Shaq McDonald (born 1995), English football (soccer) player
Shaq Moore (born 1996), American soccer player
Shaq Richardson (born 1992), Canadian football defensive back player
Shaq Roland (born 1993), American football wide receiver 
Shaq Thompson (born 1994), American football linebacker

Others
Shaq (film), (also known as Shukk), 2013 Pakistani mystery drama, aired on ARY Digital, and directed by Yasir Nawaz
Shaq Qureshi, a fictional character from the British soap opera Hollyoaks

See also
Big Shaq, alias of British entertainer Michael Dapaah
Shaquille (given name)
Shakeel (name)